Chen Daoxiang (born September 1962) is a major general (shaojiang) of the People's Liberation Army (PLA) who served as commander of the PLA Hong Kong Garrison between 2019 and 2022. He is a delegate to the 13th National People's Congress.

Biography
Chen was born in Xuancheng, Anhui, in September 1962. He served in the Nanjing Military Region for a long time. In April 2010, he was promoted to chief of staff of the 1st Group Army. In July 2011, he was awarded the military rank of general (shangjiang) by chairman Xi Jinping. In July 2014, he was promoted to become deputy chief of staff of Guangzhou Military Region, a position he held until April 2019, when he was transferred to Hong Kong and appointed commander of the PLA Hong Kong Garrison.

References

1962 births
Living people
People from Xuancheng
People's Liberation Army generals from Anhui
People's Republic of China politicians from Anhui
Chinese Communist Party politicians from Anhui
Commanders of the People's Liberation Army Hong Kong garrison